Pedococcus bigeumensis is a species of Gram positive, strictly aerobic, non-motile, non-endosporeforming bacterium. The species was initially isolated from soil on Bigeum Island, South Korea. The species was first described in 2013, and its name refers to the island from which it was first isolated.

The optimum growth temperature for P. bigeumensis is 28 °C and can grow in the 20-37 °C range.  The optimum pH is 7.4, and can grow in pH 7.0-12.0.

References

Intrasporangiaceae
Bacteria described in 2008